Ferrofluidic is the brand name of a staged magnetic liquid rotary sealing mechanism made by the Ferrotec Corporation and was first patented by the predecessor company's co-founder R.E.Rosensweig (USP 3,620,584). The seals are used in rotating equipment to enable rotary motion while maintaining a hermetic seal by means of a physical barrier in the form of a ferrofluid. The ferrofluid is suspended in place by use of a permanent magnet.  "These seals have become established art and are now widely used in vacuum and nuclear systems for rotary shaft penetrations and in gas pressure systems."

Benefits and limitations
Magnetic liquid rotary seals operate with no maintenance and extremely low leakage in a very wide range of applications. Ferrofluid-based seals used in industrial and scientific applications are most often packaged in mechanical seal assemblies called rotary feedthroughs, which also contain a central shaft, ball bearings and an outer housing. The ball bearings provide two important functions: maintaining the shaft's centering within the seal gap and supporting external loads. The bearings are the only mechanical wear-items, as the dynamic seal is actually a series of rings made of ultra-low vapor pressure, oil-based liquid held magnetically between the rotor and stator. Therefore, the operating life and equipment maintenance cycles are generally very long, and the drag torque very low. The magnet material is permanently charged and requires no electrical power or other re-energizing or maintenance. Ferrofluid-sealed feedthroughs reach performance levels that other technologies can't achieve, by optimizing features such as ferrofluid viscosity and magnetic strength, magnet and steel materials, bearing arrangements, and water cooling for applications with extremely high speeds or temperatures.  Ferrofluid-sealed feedthroughs routinely operate in environments including ultra-high vacuum (below 10−8 mbar), temperatures over 1,000 °C, tens of thousands of RPM, and multiple-atmosphere pressures.

Magnetic liquid seals are engineered for a wide range of applications and exposure but are generally limited to sealing gases and vapors, not direct pressurized liquid. This is due to the premature failure of the ferrofluid seal when it seals a liquid. However, a lot of research is conducted in order to solve this problem.

Each particular combination of construction materials and design features has practical limits with respect to temperature, differential pressure, speed, applied loads and operating environment; however, these limits can generally be overcome by carefully selecting or designing the device for the application. Necessary features may include multiple ferrofluid stages, water cooling, customized materials including metals, permanent magnets and ferrofluid, and exotic bearings. Ferrofluid-based seals have extremely low leak rates - almost immeasurable with laboratory equipment - however they cannot reach the levels of welded connections or other all-metal, static (non-rotating) seals.

References

External links

Video demonstration of a magnetic liquid rotary seal

Seals (mechanical)
Magnetic devices